The 1872–73 United States House of Representatives elections were held on various dates in various states between June 4, 1872 and April 7, 1873. Each state set its own date for its elections to the House of Representatives before the first session of the 43rd United States Congress convened on December 1, 1873. They coincided with the re-election of United States President Ulysses S. Grant. The congressional reapportionment based on the 1870 United States Census increased the number of House seats to 292.

Grant's Republican Party increased its majority greatly, partly at the expense of the opposition Democratic Party and partly by adding 49 new seats to the House. The pro-industry outlook of the Republicans appealed to many Northern voters, especially as the post-war economy exploded, and this allowed the party to flourish as the Industrial Revolution grew more widespread. The Republicans also benefited from a continuing association with Civil War victory as well as disarray amongst Democratic leadership.

Election summaries
Following the 1870 Census, the House was reapportioned, initially adding 40 seats, followed by a subsequent amendment to the apportionment act adding another seat to 9 states, resulting in a total increase of 49 seats. No states lost seats, 10 states had no change, 13 states gained 1 seat each, 9 states gained 2 seats, 3 states gained 3 seats, 1 State gained 4 seats, and 1 State gained 5 seats. Prior to the supplemental act, two states (New Hampshire and Vermont) had each lost 1 seat. This was the first reapportionment after the repeal of the three-fifths compromise by the 14th Amendment.

Election dates 

In 1845, Congress passed a law providing for a uniform nationwide date for choosing Presidential electors. This law did not affect election dates for Congress, which remained within the jurisdiction of State governments, but over time, the States moved their Congressional elections to this date as well. In 1872–73, there were still 9 states with earlier election dates, and 2 states with later election dates:

Early elections (1872):
June 4 Oregon
August 1 North Carolina
August 27 West Virginia
September 3 Vermont
September 9 Maine
October 8 Indiana, Nebraska, Ohio, Pennsylvania
Late elections (1873):
March 11, 1873 New Hampshire
April 7, 1873 Connecticut

Special elections 

 : 1872
 : 1873
 : 1872
 : 1873
 : 1873
 : 1873
 : 1872

Alabama

Arkansas

California 

A new seat was added, following the 1870 U.S. Census, bringing the delegation up from three to four Representatives.

Connecticut

Delaware

Florida 

Florida gained a second seat after the 1870 census, but delayed districting until 1874, electing both Representatives at-large for this election.

Georgia

Illinois

Indiana

Iowa

Kansas

Kentucky

Louisiana 

In the newly-formed , George A. Sheridan (Liberal Republican) beat P. B. S. Pinchback (Republican), the first black Governor of Louisiana. Pinchback challenged the election and it was settled in February 1875, in Sheridan's favor, only one month before the end of the Congress.

Maine

Maryland

Massachusetts

Michigan

Minnesota

Mississippi 

|-
! 
| George E. Harris
|  | Republican
| 1869
|  | Incumbent retired.New member elected.Democratic gain.
| nowrap | 

|-
! 
| Joseph L. Morphis
|  | Republican
| 1869
|  | Incumbent lost renomination.New member elected.Republican hold.
| nowrap | 

|-
! 
| Henry W. Barry
|  | Republican
| 1869
| Incumbent re-elected.
| nowrap | 

|-
! 
| George C. McKee
|  | Republican
| 1869
|  | Incumbent redistricted to the .New member elected.Republican hold.
| nowrap | 

|-
! rowspan=2 | 
| Legrand W. Perce
|  | Republican
| 1869
|  | Incumbent retired.New member elected.Republican hold.
| nowrap rowspan=2 | 
|-
| George C. McKee
|  | Republican
| 1869

|-
! 
| colspan=3 | None (new district)
|  | New member elected.Republican gain.
| nowrap | 

|}

Missouri

Nebraska 

|-
! 
| John Taffe
|  | Republican 
| 1866
|  | Incumbent retired.New member elected.Republican hold.
| nowrap | 

|}

Nevada

New Hampshire

New Jersey

New York

North Carolina

Ohio 

After redistricting and eleven retirements, only four of the nineteen incumbents were re-elected.

Oregon

Pennsylvania

Rhode Island

South Carolina

Tennessee 

|-
! data-sort-value=0 | 
| Horace Maynard
|  | Republican
| 1865
|  | Incumbent redistricted from the .Republican gain.
| nowrap | 

|-
! 
| Roderick R. Butler
|  | Republican 
| 1867
| Incumbent re-elected.
| nowrap | 

|-
! rowspan=2 | 
| Horace Maynard
|  | Republican
| 1865
|  |Incumbent redistricted to the .New member elected.Republican hold.
| nowrap rowspan=2 | 
|-
| Abraham E. Garrett
|  | Democratic
| 1870

|-
! 
| Abraham E. Garrett
|  | Democratic
| 1870
|  |Incumbent redistricted to the .New member elected.Republican gain.
| nowrap | 

|-
! 
| John M. Bright
|  | Democratic
| 1870
| Incumbent re-elected.
|  nowrap | 

|-
! 
| Edward I. Golladay
|  | Democratic
| 1870
|  |Incumbent lost re-election.New member elected.Republican gain.
| nowrap | 

|-
! 
| Washington C. Whitthorne
|  | Democratic
| 1870
| Incumbent re-elected.
|  

|-
! 
| Robert P. Caldwell
|  | Democratic
| 1870
|  |Incumbent lost renomination.New member elected.Democratic hold.
| nowrap | 

|-
! 
| William W. Vaughan
|  | Democratic
| 1870
|  |Incumbent retired.New member elected.Republican gain.
| nowrap | 

|-
! 
| colspan=3 | None (new district)
|  |New member elected.Republican gain.
| nowrap | 

|}

Texas

Vermont

Virginia

West Virginia 

|-
! 
| John J. Davis
|  | Democratic
| 1870
|  | Incumbent re-elected.Independent Democratic gain.
| nowrap | 

|-
! 
| James McGrew
|  | Republican
| 1868
|  | Incumbent retired.New member elected.Republican hold.
| nowrap | 

|-
! 
| Frank Hereford
|  | Democratic
| 1870
| Incumbent re-elected.
| nowrap | 

|}

Wisconsin 

Wisconsin elected eight members of congress on Election Day, November 5, 1872.  Two seats were newly added in reapportionment after the 1870 census.

Non-voting delegates

Colorado Territory

Dakota Territory

Idaho Territory

Montana Territory

Wyoming Territory

See also
 1872 United States elections
 1872 United States presidential election
 1872–73 United States Senate elections
 42nd United States Congress
 43rd United States Congress

Notes

References

Bibliography

External links
 Office of the Historian (Office of Art & Archives, Office of the Clerk, U.S. House of Representatives)